Myennis mandschurica is a species of ulidiid or picture-winged fly in the genus Myennis of the family Ulidiidae.

Distribution
China.

References

Ulidiidae
Insects described in 1956
Taxa named by Erich Martin Hering
Diptera of Asia
Endemic fauna of China